The British Journal of Neurosurgery is a peer-reviewed medical journal that covers neurosurgery and neurology. It is published in association with the Society of British Neurological Surgeons. The editor-in-chief is Nitin Mukerji.

According to the Journal Citation Reports, the journal has a 2019 impact factor of 1.29.
The journal has embraced social media and is present on Twitter as @BJNSNeuro as well as BJNS on LinkedIn.

References

External links 
 

Publications established in 1987
Neurosurgery journals
Neurology journals
Taylor & Francis academic journals
Academic journals associated with learned and professional societies of the United Kingdom